"Netzwerk (Falls Like Rain)" is a song by Austrian electronic music duo Klangkarussell. It was released digitally on 9 May 2014 in Europe and on 24 August 2014 in the United Kingdom. The song initially charted at number 27 in Austria. After a month of charting, it has peaked at number 7. It has also charted in Belgium, France, Germany and Switzerland. The song was written by Tobias Rieser, Adrian Held, Salif Keita, Tom Havelock, and produced by Klangkarussell, co-produced by German musician Jochen Schmalbach. It was originally an unreleased track from 2012 simply titled "Netzwerk" (German: "Network"). It was reworked in 2014 with vocals by British singer and songwriter Tom Cane. The song also features a brief sample from the song "Madan" by Salif Keita. The song is featured as the title track and second single of their debut album, Netzwerk.

Music video
A music video to accompany the release of "Netzwerk (Falls Like Rain)" was first released onto YouTube on 9 May 2014 at a total length of three minutes and fifty-nine seconds. As of March 2016 it has received more than 7 million views.

The video was directed by Charlie Robins and filmed in Belgrade, Serbia. It features Ukrainian daredevil Mustang Wanted.

Track listing

10" vinyl
Side A
Netzwerk [Falls Like Rain]
Netzwerk
Side B
Netzwerk [Falls Like Rain] (Ten Ven Remix)

Chart performance

Weekly charts

Year-end charts

Release history

References

2014 singles
2014 songs
Klangkarussell songs
Vertigo Records singles
Capitol Records singles
Universal Music Group singles
Songs written by Tom Cane
Tropical house songs
Music videos shot in Belgrade